The 2006 E3 Prijs Vlaanderen was the 49th edition of the E3 Harelbeke cycle race and was held on 25 March 2006. The race started and finished in Harelbeke. The race was won by Tom Boonen of the Quick-Step team.

General classification

References

2006 in Belgian sport
2006